Bald Head is a village in the town of York in York County, Maine, United States, on the Atlantic coast.

The community takes its name from a nearby rock formation of the same name. Bald Head has been noted for its unusual place name.

References

York, Maine
Villages in York County, Maine